Haeri may refer to the following people:

 Abdolkarim Haeri Yazdi (1859–1937), Iranian cleric
 Kazem al-Haeri (born 1938), Iraqi-born Iranian cleric and grand ayatollah
 Mehdi Haeri Yazdi (1923–1999), Iranian philosopher and cleric
 Morteza Haeri Yazdi (1916–1986), Iranian cleric
 Niloofar Haeri (born 1958), Iranian-American Islamic scholar, anthropologist and linguist
 Safa Haeri (1937–2016), Iranian journalist

See also
 Lee Hae-ri (born 1985), singer and musical theater actress
 Rokni Haerizadeh (born 1978), artist